= Uddemarri =

Uddemarri Thumma Bharadwaj
- Village
- Interactive map of Uddemarri
- Coordinates: 17.6285331°N 78.679104°E
- Country: India
- State: Telangana

Area
  - Total: 9,620,000 km^{2} (3,710,000 sq mi)

Population (2009)
  - Total: 2,297
  - Density: 0.000239/km^{2} (0.000618/sq mi)

Languages
  - Official: Telugu
- Time zone: UTC+5:30 (IST)
- Telephone code: 040
- Vehicle registration: TS 08 X XXXX
- Sex ratio: 1:1(approx) ♂/♀
- Website: slnsinternet.in slns internet service 8978535999

Uddemarri is a village located in Muduchintalapally (Mandal), Tehsil of Medcha Malkajgiri district in Telangana, India. It is situated 16 km away from sub-district headquarter Muduchintalapally and 45 km away from district headquarter Hyderabad. As per 2020 stats, Uddemarri village is also a gram panchayat.
